Bynea is an electoral ward, representing part of the community of Llanelli Rural, Carmarthenshire, Wales.

Profile
In 2014, the Bynea electoral ward had an electorate of 4,931. According to the 2001 UK Census 87% were born in Wales. 35% of the population claimed to be able to speak Welsh.

Current Representation
Dafan is a ward to Llanelli Rural Council, electing three community councillors.

The Bynea Ward is a single-member ward for the purposes of Carmarthenshire County Council elections. Since 2012 it has been represented by Labour Party councillor D.M. Cundy.

Elections
The first election to the new unitary Carmarthenshire County Council took place in 1995. Bynea was by the Labour Party defeating a Green Party candidate who was a sitting member of Llanelli Borough Council.

 

At the 1999, Labour held the seat unopposed.

 

In 2004 the sitting Labour member chose to contest the Llwynhendy ward and Bynea was won by an Independent.

 
 

In 2008, Labour fared badly in the Llanelli area as a whole and Woolridge comfortably held Bynea.

 
 
 

In 2012, on a very low turnout, Labour came from third place to take a seat held by the Independent candidate, a member of the cabinet, since 2004.

Earlier History

County Council Elections
The long-standing ward boundaries in the Llanelli Rural area were redrawn in the 1980s to create three new wards, namely  Felinfoel, Hengoed and Llwynhendy. Each of these wards returned a member to Dyfed County Council in 1989 and 1993. For county elections, Bynea was part of the Llwynhendy ward.

When the current Carmarthenshire County Council was formed in 1995, the Bynea Wards elected one member to the new authority.

District Council Elections
At the same time as the boundary changes for county elections, noted above, six wards were created in the Llanelli Rural area for district and community elections. Therefore, from 1987, Bynea formed an electoral ward for the purposes of elections to Llanelli Borough Council. Bynea returned one member, for the Labour Party in 1987 and for the Green Party in 1991.

External links

References

Carmarthenshire electoral wards
Llanelli Rural